Efim is a given name, also spelled as Yefim. It is possibly derived from the Greek name Euthymios (Εὐθύμιος; ; latinized as Euthymius). Notable people with the name include:

Efim Alexandrov (born 1960), Russian-Jewish comedian
Efim Bogoljubov (1889–1962), Russian-German chess grandmaster
Efim Dzigan (1898–1981), Soviet film director
Efim Etkind (1918–1999), Russian philologist
Efim Fradkin (1924–1999), Russian physicist
Efim Geller (1925–1998), Soviet chess grandmaster
Efim Jourist (1947–2007), Ukrainian composer
Efim Kolbintsev (1875–), Russian peasant, treasurer, merchant and deputy of the Fourth Imperial Duma from Orenburg Governorate
Efim Motpan (born 1971), Moldovan racewalker
Efim Shifrin (born 1956), Russian actor
Efim Zelmanov (born 1955), Russian-American mathematician
Yefim Alekseyevich Cherepanov and Miron Yefimovich Cherepanov (1774–1842) and (1803–1849), Russian inventors, father and son
Yefim Bronfman (born 1958), Russian-Israeli pianist
Yefim Chaplits (1768–1825), ethnic Pole, general of the Russian Empire
Yefim Chulak (born 1948), Russian former volleyball player
Yefim Golïshev (1897–1970), Ukrainian-born painter and composer
Yefim Karskiy (1861–1931), linguist-Slavist, ethnographer and paleographer
Yefim Kopelyan (1912–1975), Russian actor of theater and cinema
Yefim Moiseevich Fomin (1909–1941), Jewish-Soviet Political Commisar

Russian masculine given names